"Boogie Woogie" is a song written by Australian singer-songwriter Dannii Minogue and Dee Wright for Eurogroove's greatest hits album The Best Of (1995). The song features guest vocals by Minogue and was produced by Tetsuya Komuro. It was released as a Japanese-only single in June 1995 and reached number one on the Japanese singles chart.

Formats and track listings 
These are the formats and track listings of major single releases of "Boogie Woogie".

CD single
(CTDR-26002; Released June 1995)
 "Boogie Woogie"  (Original mix) – 4:11
 "Boogie Woogie" (Extended mix) – 6:21
 "Boogie Woogie"  (Club remix) – 4:49

References

1995 singles
Dannii Minogue songs
Songs written by Tetsuya Komuro
1995 songs
Songs written by Dannii Minogue